Kane Brett Robinson (born 21 May 1985), better known as Kano, is a British rapper, songwriter and actor from East Ham, London. A significant contributor to grime music, he is widely considered one of the pioneers of the grime culture, alongside artists such as Wiley and Dizzee Rascal. His fifth album, Made in the Manor was shortlisted for the 2016 Mercury Prize and won Best Album at the 2016 MOBO Awards. On screen, he is best known for playing the role of Sully in Top Boy.

Music career

1985–2003: Early years
Kane Brett Robinson, born in East Ham, London was raised by Jamaican parents, Kano attended Langdon Secondary School. In his younger years he was a promising footballer, representing Chelsea, West Ham United Norwich City and Celtic by the age of 13, eventually abandoning his sporting ambitions in favour of a musical career.

He joined the East London-based, N.A.S.T.Y. Crew (Natural Artistic Sounds Touching You), whose original line-up consisted of Kano, Marcus Nasty, Jammer, D Double E, Ghetts, Demon, Stormin, Mak 10, Monkstar, Sharky Major, Armour, and Hyper. N.A.S.T.Y Crew had a popular show on pirate radio station Deja Vu. Airing Monday nights from 8:00 to 10:00 pm, the sets featured established up-and-coming guests, including Dizzee Rascal, Durrty Goodz, and Wiley. Kano used the crew's underground popularity as a springboard, leaving N.A.S.T.Y. to release his first solo track in 2002. He was then signed as a solo artist and began work on his debut solo album.

2004–2005: Home Sweet Home
In 2004, Kano modelled Hugo Boss's Spring/Summer collection, but declined to begin recording and touring commitments. Shortly afterwards Kano released his debut major label solo single, "P's & Q's", on a 12" vinyl-only release, which was an underground hit.

In 2005 he released his second single, "Typical Me", produced by Dirty Rag and featuring Ghetts. "Typical Me" reached No. 22 in the UK Singles Charts. The video for "Typical Me" was directed by Andy Hylton. The third single, "Remember Me", fared less well in the charts, reaching No. 71. Two weeks later, on 27 June 2005, Kano's début album Home Sweet Home was released. It debuted inside the UK top 40 at No. 36 in its first week. In September 2005, the fourth single "Nite Nite" was released, featuring Leo the Lion and The Streets. Home Sweet Home went on to gain gold status in the UK, and was well reviewed across the British press.

"Nite Nite" was released as the next single from the album, hitting No. 25 in the UK charts and spending six weeks altogether in the top 75. Shortly after the release of "Nite Nite", a promotional video for "Reload It", which featured live performance clips and backstage footage, was released to UK video station, Channel U. In December 2005, Kano released a remixed version of album track "Nobody Don't Dance No More" featuring Katie Pearl, as a download-only single. The track was also featured as a B-side on CD: 2 of "Nite Nite". On 13 March 2006 Kano released the fifth and final single from the album, a double A-side of "Brown Eyes" and "Signs in Life". The single was released on a vinyl format only, and included a free sticker, which made it ineligible for chart inclusion.

Kano's music was also featured on Run the Road, a 2005 compilation featuring 16 grime tracks. The compilation included contributions from other grime artists including: Wiley, Dizzee Rascal and Lady Sovereign. Kano performed a verse on the track "Destruction VIP" and was featured on three other tracks, including "P's and Q's".

2006–2007: London Town
On 23 March 2006 Kano performed at Anson Rooms in Bristol for MTV2's Spanking New Music along with JME, N-Dubz and Unklejam. He performed tracks including "London Town", "P's & Q's", "Brown Eyes", "Me & My Mic" and tracks from the Beats & Bars mixtape. Kano confirmed on the show that his next album was to be called London Town.

Prior to the album's release, Kano put out a mixtape (simply called Mixtape on the front cover), which included new material such as and Kano's own versions of hip-hop songs, including Jay-Z's "Public Service Announcement", Nas's "Black Republican" and Kanye West's "My Way Home". The mixtape also included a preview of "Buss It Up", a song that featured on the later release London Town. The album was released on 10 September 2007, preceded by the single "This Is The Girl", featuring Craig David, on 27 August. Along with David, the album featured collaborations with Blur and Gorillaz frontman Damon Albarn, Kate Nash, and Vybz Kartel. Kano toured the UK in support of the record, as well as performing the whole album at the Jazz Cafe in October 2007 alongside a live band. Kano also sold out London Astoria in the same month to put on an entertaining show also promoting Tinchy Stryder on his tour.

2008–2009: 140 Grime St and MC No. 1
In 2008, Kano no longer was signed to 679 Recordings as he wished to return to his "grimier roots" and had posted all new freestyles on his MySpace page. In April of that year he released a mixtape, MC No. 1, followed by third album 140 Grime Street hit the shelves. Despite primarily using American hip-hop-style beats, seemingly contra to his previous comments, both were well-received. 140 Grime Street was released on 29 September 2008 through BPM (Bigger Picture Music). The majority of the album was produced by Mikey J, with Wiley and DaVinChe supplying two beats each, and Skepta handing the production for the song "These MC's". The album featured guest appearances from Ghetto, Skepta, Wiley, and Mikey J. The first single released was "Hustler."

A second single, "Rock N Rolla", was first premiered on Radio 1xtra DJ Mista Jam's radio show. The single was officially released in October. "More Than One Way" also premiered on Mista Jam's 1xtra radio show. The video was also released on Kano's official YouTube page. The track was written for a campaign to promote the Diploma and was given away for free exclusively from The Diploma website. The music video was made with the help of students from around the UK. The TV ad shows Kano walking through a crowd of students whose Diploma qualifications pop up in bubbles above them. Creative and media students helped in producing the video and construction students helped make the set.

2010–2013: Method to the Maadness and mixtapes
Kano's fourth album, Method to the Maadness, was released on 30 August 2010 and charted in the UK Albums Chart at number 45, making it the rapper's fourth successive album to appear in the Top 50. The lead single, "Upside" (featuring Michelle Breeze), was released on 23 August 2010. That same year he provided vocals on the third Gorillaz studio album, Plastic Beach. He collaborated with fellow British rapper Bashy and the National Orchestra for Arabic Music on the track "White Flag".

In September, Kano announced a four-track collaborative EP with the producer Mikey J. The EP was entitled Not for the A List because Kano did not want anything to stand in his way when it came to making the music. Part of the EP was to make one track a week and to release it to a DJ to play on radio, ensuring it was a different DJ each week over a timeline of four weeks. The first track was "Random Antics"' the second track, "Alien", and featured Maxsta, the first label signing by the SBTV founder Jamal Edwards. The third week was a track titled "E.T", featuring Wiley, Scorcher and Wretch 32. The fourth track, "House of Pain", featuring Ghetts, was delayed due to the length being 7 and a half minutes. The DJ had to get permission from his boss to play it. It is expected Kano is using the EP to build anticipation for his fifth studio album, to be released in 2012.

In October 2011 Kano made his acting debut in the Channel 4 drama Top Boy. His character, Sully, was originally written as an Asian drug dealer. Casting director Des Hamilton, director Yann Demange and writer Ronan Bennett were so impressed with his chemistry test with co-star Ashley Walters, causing the character to be rewritten. The original run of the show went for two seasons, before Channel 4 cancelled it in 2014.

On 13 November 2011, Kano announced via Twitter that he would release a mixtape some time that month entitled Girls Over Guns. On 1 January 2012, Kano released a mixtape called Jack Bauer 2.4 as the follow up mixtape to the 2010 edition.

2014–2018: Made in the Manor
On 26 April 2014, Kano released a music video via SB.TV for "Flow of the Year' featuring JME. The following year came his single "Hail" in March 2015 and its B-side "New Banger" released via Noisey in April 2015. This preceded his fifth album Made in the Manor, eventually released in 2016. Promotion for the album began with the single "3 Wheel-Ups" featuring Wiley and Giggs. The song premiered on MistaJam's BBC Radio 1Xtra show on 7 January 2016. It entered the UK Singles Chart at number 126 and the UK R&B Chart at number 16.

The album entered the UK Albums Chart at number 8, becoming Kano's highest-charting album since London Town (2007).

In 2017 it was announced that streaming platform Netflix would be reviving Top Boy, with Kano reprising his role as Sully. The revival was, in part, due to the interest of Canadian rapper Drake, who was a fan of the original series and whose team co-produced the new episodes. The third and fourth series premiered on Netflix in September 2019 and March 2022, respectively. A fifth and final series was announced on 31 March 2022.

2019–present: Hoodies All Summer
On 30 August 2019, Kano's sixth studio album Hoodies All Summer was released following its announcement the month previously. The album would be later shortlisted for the Mercury Prize 2020, the second time in Kano's career. Kano provided vocals again in 2020 for the seventh Gorillaz studio album Song Machine, Season One: Strange Timez, along with Spanish singer Roxani Arias for the song "Dead Butterflies". In October 2020, Kano collaborated with Fraser T. Smith in the production of Smith's debut album "12 Questions".

In March 2022 it was announced that Kano would play the lead role in The Kitchen, a dystopian thriller for Netflix co-written and produced by British actor Daniel Kaluuya.

Awards and achievements
He was voted Best Newcomer award in 2004 at the Urban Music Awards and then in 2005, Kano was nominated for 4 MOBO (Music of Black Origin) Awards, winning the award for Best Newcomer. He also won an award at the first Channel U "Best of British" Awards. On New Year's Eve 2005, Kano was announced as one of "London's Heroes of 2005" by Mayor of London Ken Livingstone. He was also nominated for a BRIT Award for Best Urban Act in January 2006. In 2016 Kano's album Made in the Manor was nominated for the Mercury Music Award. Made in the Manor also won 'Best Album' in the 2016 MOBO awards. He was nominated for a second Mercury Music Award for his 6th Studio album Hoodies All Summer.

In 2022, for his performance in the fourth series of Top Boy, Kano won a MOBO Award for Best Performance in a TV Show/Film.

Personal life
Kano is a supporter of Liverpool F.C.

Political views
In November 2019, along with 34 other musicians, Kano signed a letter endorsing the Labour Party leader Jeremy Corbyn in the 2019 UK general election with a call to end austerity. In December 2019, along with 42 other leading cultural figures, he signed a letter endorsing the Labour Party under Corbyn's leadership in the 2019 general election. The letter stated that "Labour's election manifesto under Jeremy Corbyn's leadership offers a transformative plan that prioritises the needs of people and the planet over private profit and the vested interests of a few."

Discography 

 Home Sweet Home (2005)
 London Town (2007)
 140 Grime Street (2008)
 Method to the Maadness (2010)
 Made in the Manor (2016)
 Hoodies All Summer (2019)

Filmography

References

External links
Kano on Myspace

1985 births
English footballers
English people of Jamaican descent
English hip hop musicians
Black British male rappers
Chelsea F.C. players
Grime music artists
Norwich City F.C. players
Footballers from East Ham
People from East Ham 
Rappers from London
West Ham United F.C. players
Living people
English male rappers
21st-century English male actors
679 Artists artists
Association footballers not categorized by position